Song for My Father may refer to:

"Song for My Father" (composition), a Horace Silver composition
Song for My Father (album), the Silver recording on which the composition first appeared